WT.Social, also known as WikiTribune Social or simply WT, is a microblogging and social networking service on which users contribute to "subwikis". It was founded in October 2019 by Wikipedia cofounder Jimmy Wales as an alternative to Facebook and Twitter. The service contains no advertisements and runs on donations. On launch it gained 400,000 registered users by 3 December 2019. Member growth was less rapid thereafter; the site had 508,980 users on 5 November 2022.

Creation and launch 
Jimmy Wales created WT.Social (originally formatted as "WT:Social") after becoming frustrated with Facebook and Twitter for what he called their "clickbait nonsense". The format is meant to combat fake news by providing evidence-based news with links and clear sources. Users are able to edit and flag misleading links. WT.Social allows users to share links to news-sites with other users in "subwikis". Unlike its predecessor (WikiTribune, which Wales co-founded with Orit Kopel), WT.Social was not crowdfunded. Wales was quoted as wanting to "keep a tight rein on the costs". In October 2019, Wales launched the site. When a new user signed up they would be placed on a waiting list with thousands of others. To skip the list and gain access to the site, users either had to make a donation or share a link with friends. By November 6, the site had 25,000 users. That number was claimed to be 200,000 by mid-November and 400,000 by December 3. However, this rapid growth was not sustained; the number of users reported as of 5 November 2022 was 508,980.

Subsequent development 

Quoted in the Stanford Social Innovation Review for Summer 2020, Wales said: "We're not doing a good job of actually exposing the best stuff on the platform. So that's kind of our next phase in evolution." This approach involved highlighting contributions by public figures.

Software

As of launch, WT.Social runs on proprietary software. However, as of November 7, 2019, Wales stated that he had just learnt about ActivityPub and was looking into it. Later, Wales stated that the code would be released under GPLv3 in the future.

References

External links

Internet properties established in 2019
British social networking websites
Jimmy Wales